The Play-offs of the 2000 Fed Cup Asia/Oceania Zone Group II were the final stages of the Group II Zonal Competition involving teams from Asia and Oceania. Those that qualified for this stage placed first and second in their respective pools.

The four teams were then paired up the team from a different placing of the other group for a play-off tie, with the winners being promoted to Group I in 2001.

Uzbekistan vs. Tajikistan

  advanced to Group I in 2001, where they placed third in their pool of five.

Pacific Oceania vs. Philippines

  advanced to Group I in 2001, where they placed last in their pool of five and was thus relegated down to Group II for 2002.

See also
Fed Cup structure

References

External links
 Fed Cup website

2000 Fed Cup Asia/Oceania Zone